Petro Ruci Stadium is a multi-use stadium in Orikum, Albania. The stadium has a capacity of 2,000 people and it is mostly used for football matches and it is the home ground of KF Oriku.

References

KF Oriku
Football venues in Albania
Multi-purpose stadiums
Buildings and structures in Himara